Jan Martin Sagvaag (20 October 1926 - 7 March 2014) was a Norwegian footballer.

He played club football for Årstad IL, which had spells on the highest tier, the Main League, in the 1950s. Sagvaag started the international against Yugoslavia in June 1952, and scored Norway's only goal in the 1-4 loss. However, he was not capped again. He died in 2014.

References

1926 births
2014 deaths
Footballers from Bergen
Norwegian footballers
Norway international footballers
Eliteserien players
Association football forwards